Eyad Omar Hammoud (born 24 July 2001) is a former professional footballer who played as a forward.

Born in Lebanon to a Lebanese father and a Bulgarian mother, Hammoud moved to Bulgaria at a young age and obtained citizenship; he represented Bulgaria at youth level between 2016 and 2019, before switching allegiance to Lebanon.

Club career

Lokomotiv Plovdiv
Hammoud made his professional debut for Lokomotiv Plovdiv on 20 November 2016, in the local derby against Botev Plovdiv. At age of 15 years, 3 months and 26 days he became the second-youngest player to play in Bulgarian First League. Lokomotiv won the match 2–0, with Hammoud assisting the first goal.

Sheffield Wednesday
In the beginning of 2017, Hammoud trialled with Sheffield Wednesday, returning to Lokomotiv with and option to sign with the team in the summer. On 27 June 2017, he signed a two-year contract with the club, joining the under-18 team until gaining a work permit. Hammoud trialed with Preston North End in April 2019, but returned to Sheffield until he was released by the club on 8 May.

Ansar
On 6 August 2019, Hammoud signed for Lebanese Premier League side Ansar on a five-year deal.

International career 
On 23 May 2017, Hammoud played for Bulgaria U16 in the 1–1 draw against Cyprus U16. He was also called up for the U18 team in March 2019 to play two friendly games against Ukraine U18. In August 2019 Hammoud switched allegiance to Lebanon, representing his native country's under-19 team in two friendly games against Armenia.

Style of play 
A center forward with good technical skills, Hammoud is a fast player, both on and off the ball, with good vision and positioning in the field. Hammoud's link up play with his team mates, as well as his eye for goal, are vital in his teams' attacking plays.

Personal life
Hammoud was born in Majdal Anjar, Lebanon. His father, Omar, is Lebanese and his mother, Maria, is Bulgarian from Burgas. He moved with his family to Plovdiv, Bulgaria, in 2009 at the age of eight. He holds dual citizenship, Lebanese and Bulgarian.

Career statistics

Club

Honours
Sheffield Wednesday
 U18 Professional Development League Division 2: 2018–19
 U18 Professional Development League Division 2 North: 2018–19

Individual
 Bulgarian First League Debut of the Year: 2016

Notes

References

External links
 
 
 

Living people
2001 births
People from Zahle District
Lebanese footballers
Bulgarian footballers
Lebanese people of Bulgarian descent
Bulgarian people of Lebanese descent
Sportspeople of Lebanese descent
Association football forwards
PFC Lokomotiv Plovdiv players
Sheffield Wednesday F.C. players
Al Ansar FC players
First Professional Football League (Bulgaria) players
Bulgaria youth international footballers
Lebanon youth international footballers
Lebanese expatriate footballers
Lebanese expatriate sportspeople in England
Bulgarian expatriate footballers
Bulgarian expatriate sportspeople in England
Expatriate footballers in England